Central Connector is the name of several proposed traffic schemes:

Central Connector, Auckland, a bus rapid transit link between Britomart Transport Centre in the Auckland CBD, New Zealand, and the commercial suburb of Newmarket.
Central Connector, a proposed but never constructed tollway of the Orlando-Orange County Expressway Authority, Orange County, Florida, USA